Yibo Koko is a Nigerian film maker, art director, creative artist and producer. Koko created the Seki Dance Drama, telling the story of the Rivers State people through dance. He is the Director General of the Rivers State Tourism Development Agency and a voting member of the Nigerian Oscar selection committee

References 

Living people
People from Rivers State
New York Film Academy alumni
University of Port Harcourt alumni
Alumni of the University of Oxford
1967 births
Nigerian film directors